Friedland is a town in the district Mecklenburgische Seenplatte, Mecklenburg-Vorpommern, Germany.

It is only 22 km from the district seat and bigger town Neubrandenburg, but still Friedland remains a local center for surrounding communities like Galenbeck (Kotelow, Lübbersdorf, Schwichtenberg), Brunn and Boldekow, and has approximately 6,500 citizens. The former municipality Genzkow was merged into Friedland in May 2019.

It was founded in 1244 by the Prince-electors Otto and Johann of Brandenburg, then having the name Vredeland.

Notable people

Sons and daughters of the city

 Andreas Helvigius (1572-1643), philologist, educator
 Friederike Krüger (1789-1858), participant of the Liberation War
 Emilie Mayer (1812-1883), composer
 Rudolf Berlin (1833-1897), ophthalmologist

People who have worked here

 Ernst Boll (1817-1868), natural scientist, was a house teacher in Friedland
 Fritz Reuter (1810-1874), low German poet, studied at the school in Friedland
 Daniel Runge (1804-unknown), theologian and parliamentarian, attended the scholars’ school here
 Wilhelm Sauer (1831-1916), organ builder, spent his youth in Friedland
 Johann Heinrich von Thünen (1783-1850), agriculturist and economist, led the Liepen family in 1806 and married the Friedland mayor and estate owner Helena Sophia Berlin.

References

External links

 Official website

Towns in Mecklenburg-Western Pomerania
Cities and towns in Mecklenburg
Populated places established in the 1240s
Grand Duchy of Mecklenburg-Strelitz
1240s establishments in the Holy Roman Empire
1244 establishments in Europe